Joel Alan Byrom (born 14 September 1986) is an English professional footballer who plays as a midfielder for Northern Premier League Division One West club Clitheroe.

Byrom started his career at Blackburn Rovers at the age of 14, and spent four-and-a-half years in the club's academy, progressing from their centre of excellence to the reserve team. He did not make any first-team appearances for the club, and was subsequently released in summer 2006. Byrom joined League Two club Accrington Stanley before the start of the 2006–07 season, although was released by Accrington in January 2007, and opted to join local club Clitheroe on a short-term basis. He then signed for Southport, before rejoining Clitheroe in August 2007; captaining the team at the age of 20. He attracted transfer interest from Northwich Victoria, who subsequently signed him for a small four-figure fee in January 2008. 

Byrom spent a year-and-a-half at the Cheshire club, before joining Stevenage for a fee of £15,000 in May 2009. Byrom was part of the Stevenage team that earned back-to-back promotions from the Conference Premier to League One. He left Stevenage after three years and joined Preston North End in August 2012. During his time at Preston, he was loaned out to Oldham Athletic and Northampton respectively. The latter move was made permanent in January 2015, and he helped Northampton achieve promotion to League One during the 2015–16 season. Byrom joined Mansfield Town in December 2016 and spent a year-and-a-half there before rejoining Stevenage in June 2018, where he spent two seasons. Byrom signed for Farsley Celtic of the National League North in September 2020 before rejoining Clitheroe in January 2022. He has also represented the England C team.

Early life
Byrom was born in Oswaldtwistle, Lancashire. His grandfather Ray Byrom was also a footballer.

Club career

Early career
Byrom started his career at the Blackburn Rovers centre of excellence after being scouted playing for local junior team Oswaldtwistle United at the age of 14. He progressed through the youth system at Ewood Park, and captained the under-17 team, before graduating into the reserve team after playing regularly in the FA Youth Cup in 2004. He did not break into the first-team at Blackburn and was subsequently released in 2006. Byrom subsequently signed for League Two club Accrington Stanley, on a six-month contract ahead of the 2006–07 season, after impressing manager John Coleman whilst on trial there, a trial which Byrom had requested. His grandfather Ray Byrom played for the club under its previous guise in the 1950s. He made his debut for the Lancashire club in a 1–1 draw against Carlisle United in the Football League Trophy in October 2006. Byrom found it difficult to break into the first-team, making one further appearance for Stanley, which came as a substitute in a 3–3 draw with Shrewsbury Town on 2 December 2006. He was released by Accrington on 12 January 2007. Byrom later stated at this stage in his career he "considered just getting a job and playing for fun", and that his time at Accrington "wasn't really a good time for me. I didn't play much".

Following his release from Accrington, Byrom joined Northern Premier League First Division club Clitheroe on a short-term contract. He finished the 2006–07 season as the club's top goalscorer with 11 league goals having joined them in January 2007, which included scoring a hat-trick against Kidsgrove Athletic on 12 March 2007. Byrom's Clitheroe contract expired and Conference North club Southport signed him on non-contract terms for the start of the 2007–08 season, where he scored two goals in two games. Despite being offered a contract by Southport manager Peter Davenport, Byrom opted to re-join Clitheroe in August 2007. On signing a two-year deal with Clitheroe, Byrom said "I thought about giving up football when I left Accrington, but I really enjoyed my time at Clitheroe, they've given me a new lease of life and a licence to do what I want on the park". Clitheroe chairman, Carl Garner, said "this is a big day for Clitheroe. This is one of the biggest signings the club has made. He's a special player and a special talent". In the first half of the 2007–08 season, Byrom scored six goals in all competitions for Clitheroe, which attracted transfer interest from Conference Premier team Northwich Victoria. He played his last game for the Northern Premier League club in a 3–3 draw with local rivals Rossendale United, a game in which he captained the team for the first time.

Northwich Victoria
Byron signed for Conference Premier club Northwich Victoria on a free transfer on 3 January 2008. He made his debut for Northwich in a 2–1 defeat against Aldershot Town at Victoria Stadium, scoring Northwich's goal. Byrom scored the club's second goal in a 2–1 away victory at Stevenage on 22 April 2008, a result that ultimately secured Northwich's Conference Premier status for another season. He played 21 games during the club's 2007–08 season, scoring five times from midfield.

During the early stages of the 2008–09 season, Byrom played regularly in the centre of midfield. He scored his first goal of the season away at Kettering Town on 23 September 2008, a "25-yard drive into the top corner of the net". Byrom had a hernia operation shortly after the club's 4–1 defeat to Eastbourne Borough in December 2008, keeping him out of the first-team for ten weeks. He returned to the first-team on 3 February 2009, playing the whole match in a 1–0 defeat to Altrincham. He played regularly for the remainder of the season, and scored his second career hat-trick against Rushden and Diamonds in a 4–2 victory on 28 March 2009. Northwich were relegated from the Conference Premier in April 2009, despite the club winning their last six games of the season. Byrom's last match for Northwich was in the club's 2–1 away victory at the Kassam Stadium against Oxford United. He played 52 times during his one-and-a-half years with Northwich, scoring nine goals.

Stevenage
He signed for Conference Premier club Stevenage Borough for a fee of £15,000 on 16 May 2009. He made his debut for the Hertfordshire club in a 1–1 draw at home to Tamworth in the opening game of the 2009–10 season, a match in which he was sent-off in the 90th minute for a second bookable offence. He scored his first Stevenage goal on his return to the first-team in a 3–0 victory against Ebbsfleet United on 18 August 2008, Byrom scored from just inside Crawley Town's half on 27 March 2010, lobbing the ball into the goal from 45-yards. Byrom scored the second goal in a 2–0 victory against Kidderminster Harriers on 17 April 2010; the match that ultimately secured Stevenage's promotion to the Football League for the first time in their history. On finishing the season as league champions, Byrom said – "It feels brilliant. Words can't really describe it. It's an unbelievable feeling". He played 48 times in all competitions during his first season with the club, scoring five goals.

Byrom started in Stevenage's first Football League game, a 2–2 home draw against Macclesfield Town on 7 August 2010. After playing the whole game in Stevenage's 1–0 defeat at Cheltenham Town in September 2010, Byrom suffered a number of injuries that kept him out of the first-team for five months. He returned to first-team action in February 2011, coming on as an 89th-minute substitute in a 3–0 defeat at Bury. Byrom scored his first goal of the season in Stevenage's 2–0 home victory against Accrington Stanley in the League Two play-off semi-final first leg, reaching the ball before Accrington goalkeeper Alex Cisak to double Stevenage's lead. He played the whole game in the second leg, a 1–0 victory that ensured Stevenage made the play-off final. Byrom started in the final, a 1–0 victory against Torquay United at Old Trafford, a win that meant Stevenage earned back-to-back promotions to League One. He made twelve appearances, scoring once, during the season.

He made his first start of the 2011–12 season in Stevenage's first home victory of the season, playing the first 76 minutes in a 4–2 victory over Rochdale on 3 September 2011. Byrom scored his first goal of the season in the club's 6–1 away victory against Colchester United on 26 December 2011. Byrom scored in Stevenage's televised FA Cup tie away at Premier League club Tottenham Hotspur in that year, scoring from the penalty spot to give Stevenage a brief lead before Tottenham came back to secure a 3–1 win. He went on to score two further goals during the latter stages of the season; once in a 2–2 draw away at Sheffield United, and the other in a 3–0 win over Bury, on the last day of the regular season as Stevenage earned a place in the League One play-offs following their sixth-place finish. He played in both play-off semi-final legs, which Stevenage lost 1–0 on aggregate to Sheffield United. He made 40 appearances during the season, scoring five times. Despite playing regularly under new manager Gary Smith, Byrom rejected the offer of a contract extension, and left Stevenage on 25 May 2012. During his three-year spell with the club, he made 100 appearances in all competitions, scoring eleven goals.

Preston North End
After leaving Stevenage, Byrom joined League One club Preston North End on 12 August 2012, then managed by Graham Westley, who had previously signed him for Stevenage. He signed on a free transfer. Byrom made his competitive debut for Preston in the club's 2–1 away victory over Bury on 8 September 2012, coming on as a second-half substitute. Byrom scored his first goal in his third appearance for the club, scoring the first goal in the club's 5–0 win over Hartlepool United at Deepdale on 18 September 2012. Byrom made 27 appearances during his first season at Preston, eleven of which as a substitute, scoring three times.

Byrom remained at Preston for the start of the 2013–14 season, making his first appearance of the season on 25 August 2013, coming on as an 82nd-minute substitute and scoring five minutes later in an eventual 4–4 draw away at Coventry City. He signed a one-year contract extension with Preston on 7 December 2013, thus keeping him contracted to the club until the summer of 2015. Despite having signed a new contract, Byrom did not play again for Preston, and on 14 March 2014, he joined fellow League One club Oldham Athletic on an emergency loan agreement until the end of the 2013–14 season. He made his Oldham debut a day after joining the club, playing the whole match in a 1–1 draw at Crewe Alexandra. His loan spell at Oldham was disrupted by injury and he made four appearances during the two-month spell before returning to parent club Preston in May 2014.

Northampton Town
Having made no appearances for Preston at the beginning of the 2014–15 season, Byrom joined League Two club Northampton Town on a four-month loan deal on 21 August 2014. He made his debut for Northampton two days after signing for the club, starting in a 1–1 draw against Shrewsbury Town at Sixfields. Byrom scored his first goal for the club in a 3–2 away defeat to Cheltenham Town on 18 October 2014. Byrom was a mainstay in the Northampton midfield during the loan spell, making 23 appearances, and his loan agreement was subsequently made permanent on 8 January 2015. He joined Northampton on a short-term contract running until the end of the season after his contract with Preston was terminated by mutual consent. He continued to play regularly for the remainder of the season, and added two further goals to his tally, both coming in February 2015; firstly scoring after just 26 seconds in a 2–1 victory over Morecambe, before scoring Northampton's second as they beat Shrewsbury Town by the same scoreline. Shortly before the end of the season, on 23 April 2015, Byrom signed a new two-year contract with the club. He made 43 appearances in all competitions for Northampton, scoring three times, during a season that saw the club finish in mid-table in League Two.

Byrom started in the club's opening match of the 2015–16 season, playing the whole 90 minutes in a 1–0 away win at newly promoted Bristol Rovers on 8 August 2015. He scored his first goal of the season when his free-kick from the right touchline sailed straight in as Northampton secured a 4–2 win at Morecambe on 19 September 2015. He also scored an own goal in the same match. He was a regular starter for the club throughout the season, making 40 appearances and scoring twice, as Northampton achieved promotion to League One after finishing as League Two champions. This meant it was the second time Byrom had won promotion from the fourth tier of English football, having achieved the same feat at Stevenage five seasons earlier.

Despite having been a regular in the first-team at Northampton over the previous two seasons, Byrom made just four appearances in the opening four months of the 2016–17 season, of which two were in the EFL Trophy. In December 2016, with Byrom having not played for close to two months, the club stated that Byrom's contract had been terminated. During his two-and-a-half years at Northampton, he made 83 appearances and scored five times.

Mansfield Town
On the same day as his Northampton departure was announced, on 31 December 2016, Byrom joined League Two club Mansfield Town. He made his Mansfield debut three days later in the club's 1–0 away win at Blackpool. Byrom played regularly in the centre of midfield for the remainder of the season, making 22 appearances. The 2017–18 season saw Byrom score his first goal for Mansfield, coming on as a half-time substitute and scoring four minutes later to give Mansfield the lead in an eventual 1–1 draw with Lincoln City on 6 March 2018. Having not been able to secure a regular first-team place during the season, making 23 appearances, Byrom was released by Mansfield upon the expiry of his contract at the end of the season.

Return to Stevenage
Following his exit from Mansfield, Byrom rejoined League Two club Stevenage on 21 June 2018. The move meant he would be playing under manager Dino Maamria for the fourth time; Maamria previously signed Byrom for Northwich Victoria, as well as coaching him at Stevenage and Preston North End respectively. Byrom made his second Stevenage debut in the club's opening match of the 2018–19 season, scoring the club's second goal in an eventual 2–2 draw with Tranmere Rovers at Broadhall Way. He scored against his former club, Oldham Athletic, in a 3–2 home victory on 3 November 2018. Byrom was ever-present in the centre of midfield for Stevenage during the season, playing in all of the club's League Two, FA Cup and EFL Cup matches. He made 48 appearances during the season, scoring twice, as Stevenage finished in tenth position in League Two, one point off of the play-off places. He signed a one-year contract extension with the club on 25 June 2019. Injury restricted Byrom to just seven appearances during the 2019–20 season, which was curtailed due to the COVID-19 pandemic in March 2020. He was released by Stevenage in June 2020.

Farsley Celtic
After deciding to relocate and return up north, Byrom signed a one-year contract with National League North club Farsley Celtic on 2 September 2020. He debuted for Farsley in the club's 2–1 defeat to Spennymoor Town on 6 October 2020. Byrom made two appearances in the league before he suffered a groin injury. He recovered from the injury, but the 2020–21 National League North season was curtailed due to restrictions associated with the COVID-19 pandemic in February 2021. He signed a new one-year contract with Farsley on 4 May 2021.

Clitheroe
Byrom returned to Northern Premier League Division One West club Clitheroe on 11 January 2022, where he spent the early years of his career.

International career
Byrom was called up to the England C team in May 2009, for the International Challenge Trophy final against a Belgium under-21 team. Byrom started the match, as England were beaten 1–0 at the Kassam Stadium.

Style of play
Byrom is a midfielder, and is more comfortable in the centre of midfield. He is left-footed, although the left side is not his natural position, and he is rarely deployed as a winger. In 2007, Clitheroe chairman, Carl Garner, said that Byrom has "tremendous skill and potential", adding "Joel is a quality player. He can do things with the ball that players on the television can't. In May 2009, Stevenage manager Graham Westley believed that the acquisition of Byrom would "give the squad more balance", and has also described him as having a "cultured left-foot" that enables him to open up opposition defences. On securing the signature of Byrom, Westley said, "Joel is very creative going forward and is going to be one hell of a player. I was delighted to secure his signature as he is a real talent". Dino Maamria has called Byrom a "creative midfielder", as well as being able to unlock defences. Byrom has called himself "a good passer of the ball", as well as being able to "chip in with a few goals and generally get the team ticking over". In March 2010, following Stevenage's 3–0 win against Crawley Town, a game in which Byrom scored a goal from just inside Crawley's half, Westley said that Byrom has the "ability to score spectacular goals".

Career statistics

Honours
Stevenage
 Conference Premier: 2009–10
 FA Trophy runner-up: 2009–10
 League Two play-offs: 2010–11

Northampton Town
 League Two: 2015–16

References

External links
 

1986 births
Living people
People from Oswaldtwistle
Association football midfielders
Footballers from Lancashire
English footballers
Blackburn Rovers F.C. players
Accrington Stanley F.C. players
Southport F.C. players
Northwich Victoria F.C. players
Stevenage F.C. players
Preston North End F.C. players
Oldham Athletic A.F.C. players
Northampton Town F.C. players
Mansfield Town F.C. players
National League (English football) players
English Football League players
Clitheroe F.C. players
Farsley Celtic F.C. players